Wouter Vrancken (born 3 February 1979) is a Belgian football manager and a former defensive midfielder. He is the manager of Genk.

Honours

Manager
Mechelen
 Belgian Cup: 2018–19

References

External links
Guardian Football

1979 births
Living people
Belgian footballers
Belgium youth international footballers
Belgium under-21 international footballers
Association football midfielders
Belgian Pro League players
Sint-Truidense V.V. players
K.R.C. Genk players
K.A.A. Gent players
K.V. Mechelen players
K.V. Kortrijk players
K.V. Mechelen managers
Belgian football managers
Lommel S.K. managers
K.R.C. Genk managers
Belgian Pro League managers
People from Sint-Truiden
Footballers from Limburg (Belgium)